Nouman Javaid (born 28 October 1982) is a Pakistani singer. He started his career writing, composing and singing hit songs for Mahesh Bhatt's film Jashnn. He is also one of the music directors of the movie Yamla Pagla Deewana.

Discography 
 Gham-E-Aashiquie
 Dard-E-Tanhai (Movie: Jashnn)
 Mein Chala (Movie: Jashnn)
Meri Jaan
Tere Bina
Khoye Kahan
Meri Zindagi Hai Tu
Tishnagi
A Prayer by Nouman
Yamla Pagla Deewana
 Theme music for Teri Meri Kahani (TV series) - Singer, Composer, Lyricist.

Television

See also 
List of Pakistani singers

References

External links
Nouman Javaid Official

1982 births
Living people
Bollywood playback singers
Musicians from Lahore
Urdu-language singers
Pakistani pop singers
Pakistani male singers